Gwak Bo-seong (born March 1, 1999), better known as Bdd, is a South Korean professional League of Legends player for KT Rolster. He is a two-time LCK regular season MVP, receiving the title in the 2017 summer and 2018 spring splits.

Bdd's signature champions are considered to be Galio, Azir, Taliyah, Orianna although his favourite champion is Zed.

Career 

Bdd joined CJ Entus as a substitute mid laner in April 2015 but was unable to play for them due to being underage. Bdd was hyped as "super-rookie" and the biggest Korean mid laner prospect after Faker before his debut. He finally turned 17 on March 1, 2016, and he made his competitive debut in the 2016 LCK Spring on March 2 in a series against Kongdoo Monster, which CJ won 2–1. He finished the first competitive season at 8th place. CJ Entus had a very poor showing in the 2016 LCK Summer season, going 3-15 total in set score and relegated first time in history. Bdd along with all other members left the team after the season.

In December 2016, Bdd announced his signing with Longzhu Gaming. However, he spent his whole 2017 LCK Spring season on bench. He was moved to starter in summer season and won the 2017 LCK Summer playoff as well as regular season MVP with 1300 points and set an all-time record of 11.3 KDA throughout the whole season over 44 games.

In January 2017, Longzhu Gaming was acquired by a Chinese company and rebranded into KING-ZONE DragonX. Bdd won the regular season MVP and playoff again in 2018 LCK Spring season. He and his team represented Korea for Mid-Season Invitational but they only managed to get runner-up disappointingly. KING-ZONE DragonX finished summer season at 4th place and failed to quality for 2018 World Championship after losing to Gen.G in regional qualifier.

On November 27, 2018, kt Rolster announced the singing of Bdd as their new mid laner. KT struggled in 2019 season and finished only at 9th and 8th place in spring and summer season. He left the team after a disappointing year in November 2019.

On November 20, 2019, Gen.G announced the signing of Bdd along with jungler Clid and top laner Rascal as their new members through former Gen.G player and world champion Ambition's twitch stream. Both Bdd and Clid signed a 3 years contract with the team.

Bdd won regular season MVP the 3rd time with 1200 points in 2020 LCK Spring season. Gen.G finished the regular season at 1st place but got swept by T1 in Spring playoff final. Bdd had a strong showing at 2020 Mid-Season Cup and won player of the game 3 times. Gen.G was the only Korean team getting out of groups but got eliminated by Top Esports in semi-final. In summer season, Bdd again won the MVP the 4th time in his career with 1200 points. Gen.G fell short in playoff by losing to Dragon X and finished the season at 3rd place.

Tournament results 

 1st — LCK 2017 Summer Playoffs
 1st — LCK 2018 Spring Playoffs
 2nd — 2018 Mid-Season Invitational
 2nd - LCK 2020 Spring Playoffs
 2nd - LCK 2021 Spring Playoffs

References

External links 

 

Living people
1999 births
South Korean esports players
League of Legends mid lane players
South Korean expatriate sportspeople in China
CJ Entus players
DRX (esports) players
KT Rolster players